"The Second Coming" is a poem that was written by Irish poet W. B. Yeats in 1919, first printed in The Dial in November 1920 and included in his 1921 collection of verses Michael Robartes and the Dancer.  The poem uses Christian imagery regarding the Apocalypse and Second Coming to allegorically describe the atmosphere of post-war Europe. It is considered a major work of modernist poetry and has been reprinted in several collections, including The Norton Anthology of Modern Poetry.

Historical context
The poem was written in 1919 in the aftermath of the First World War and the beginning of the Irish War of Independence in January 1919, which followed the Easter Rising in April 1916, and before the British government had decided to send in the Black and Tans to Ireland. Yeats used the phrase "the second birth" instead of "the Second Coming" in his first drafts.

The poem is also connected to the 1918–1919 flu pandemic. In the weeks preceding Yeats's writing of the poem, his pregnant wife, Georgie Hyde-Lees, caught the virus and was very close to death, but she survived. The highest death rates of the pandemic were among pregnant women, who in some areas had a death rate of up to 70%. Yeats wrote the poem while his wife was convalescing.

In popular culture

Phrases and lines from the poem are used in many works, in a variety of media, such as literature, motion pictures, television, and music. Examples of works which reference "The Second Coming" (titles, quotes, etc) include: 
Arthur M. Schlesinger Jr.'s political manifesto  The Vital Center: The Politics of Freedom, a defense of political centrism opens with citing the Yeats poem.
Chinua Achebe's novel Things Fall Apart (1958);
The Roots' platinum album "Things Fall Apart (album)" (1999) 
Joan Didion's essay collection Slouching Towards Bethlehem (1968) and The Center Will Not Hold, a Netflix documentary (2017) 
Walker Percy’s novel The Second Coming (1980) 
Peter De Vries' novel Slouching Towards Kalamazoo (1983) 
Robert B. Parker's novel The Widening Gyre (1983) 
The 1996 non-fiction book Slouching Towards Gomorrah: Modern Liberalism and American Decline by Robert Bork
The song "Slouching Towards Bethlehem" (which quotes or paraphrases almost all of the poem)  by Joni Mitchell from her 1991 album Night Ride Home
Lou Reed in his preamble to the song "Sweet Jane" on the 1978 album Live: Take No Prisoners
The episode "Slouching Toward Bethlehem" (27 October 2002) of the television series Angel
The 2003 interactive fiction game Slouching Towards Bedlam
Elyn Saks' memoir The Center Cannot Hold: My Journey Through Madness (2007)
The season 6 episode "The Second Coming" (20 May 2007) of the television series The Sopranos, in which A.J. Soprano reads and quotes the poem while struggling with depression. He again quotes it in the series finale "Made In America". In the season 5 episode 'Cold Cuts' Dr.Melfi quotes it to Tony Soprano.
The episode "Revelations" (9 November 1994) of the science fiction television series Babylon 5 
Stephen King's novel The Stand references the poem numerous times, with one character explicitly quoting lines from it 
 Jonathan Alter's political biography of Barack Obama, The Center Holds: Obama and His Enemies also cites Yeats' poem.
Junkie XL's soundtrack to Zack Snyder's Justice League features a song titled "The Center Will Not Hold, Twenty Centuries Of Stony Sleep", referencing the "second coming" of Superman after his death in the film's prequel, Batman v Superman: Dawn of Justice, and his subsequent resurrection in this film.
Gordon Gekko in Wall Street (1987) says: "So the falcon's heard the falconer, huh?"
Good Omens (1990) parodies the poem: "slouching hopefully towards Tadfield"
The title of the BBC podcast series Things Fell Apart by Jon Ronson
The episode "The Queen's Speech" (S02E07) of the Apple TV+ science fiction series See

References

External links

Text (as originally published)

1920 poems
Poetry by W. B. Yeats
Works originally published in The Dial